Robert Małek (born 15 March 1971) is a Polish international referee who has been active internationally since 2001.

He served as a referee in 2010 World Cup qualifiers.

References

1971 births
Living people
Polish football referees
Sportspeople from Zabrze